Acefylline (INN), also known as acetyloxytheophylline, is a stimulant drug of the xanthine chemical class. It acts as an adenosine receptor antagonist. It is combined with diphenhydramine in the pharmaceutical preparation etanautine to help offset diphenhydramine induced drowsiness.

A silanol–mannuronic acid conjugate of acefylline, acefylline methylsilanol mannuronate (INCI; trade name Xantalgosil C) is marketed as a lipolytic phosphodiesterase inhibitor. It is used as an ingredient in cosmeceuticals for the treatment of cellulite and as a skin conditioner.

See also 
 8-Chlorotheophylline
 Theophylline
 Caffeine

References 

Adenosine receptor antagonists
Xanthines